El Molo is an extinct language belonging to the Cushitic branch of the Afro-Asiatic language family. It was spoken by the El Molo people on the southeastern shore of Lake Turkana, in northern Kenya. Alternate names to El Molo are Dehes, Elmolo, Fura-Pawa, and Ldes. It was thought to be extinct in the middle part of the 20th century, but a few speakers were found in the later 20th century. However, it may now be truly extinct, as the eight speakers found in a survey published in 1994 were over 50. Most of the El Molo population have shifted to the neighboring Samburu language. El Molo also has no known dialects but it is similar to Daasanach

Oral tradition sees the El Molo people as an offshoot of the Arbore people in South Ethiopia. This seems to be confirmed by El Molo's linguistic proximity to the Arbore language.

Classification 

The possibly extinct El Molo language belonged to the Cushitic branch of the Afro-Asiatic classification. The Cushitic languages are only known to be spoken by 3% of the population. Cushitic is one of the largest language families of East Africa. The geographical area in which Cushitic is spoken stretches from North-East Sudan at the Egyptian border, embracing Eritrea, Jibouti, Somalia, Ethiopia, a considerable part of Kenya, and some areas of Northern Tanzania.

Population 
The El Molo population is also referred to as “Dhes, Elmolo, Fura-Pawa, Ldes, and Ndorobo”. There is an ethnic population of about 1,100 according to the 2019 census and the population is decreasing yearly. The location of this Kenyan language is in East and Southern Africa. Individuals belong to six ethnic groups: Turkana, Samburu and Maasai (Eastern Nilotic-speakers); Luo (Western Nilotic- speakers); Rendille and ElMolo (Cushitic- speaking populations). All populations are cattle herders, with the exception of El Molo that are fishermen. Unlike their surrounding neighbors, they do not depend on livestock for livelihood. Fish is their main diet. And occasionally they eat crocodile, turtle, and hippos. There are a few remaining speakers of the language, which is why El Molo (population) are rarely found to speak El Molo. (the language). Rather, they use “Samburu", which is now considered to be their primary language after the shift in tongues.

Kenyan history
Kenya is a country that has been considered to be extremely multilingual since the early nineteenth century. There are many different estimates for the ranges of indigenous languages, which is also difficult because many have not been “codified”. As noted when stating statistics with the Development Of The Language in Education Policy there were only 8 indigenous languages that had a textbook produced as late as 1949.

Intangible cultural heritage
Intangible cultural heritage (ICH) is the legacy of physical properties and intangible attributes of a group or society that are inherited from past generations, and maintained in the present for the benefit of future generations (Singh 2011). Kenya has a National Heritage Policy that recognizes its diversity and encourages the growth of rich and diverse cultures. The United Nations Educational, Scientific and Cultural Organization (UNESCO) states that ICH makes people and communities distinguishable in their history, nationalities, languages, ideology and values. (46). The past can be understood by studying intangible and tangible heritage that has been preserved over the generations. This verbal and documented history of the land is what allows the growth for the present and future generations. Diverse cultures from surrounding communities also allow diversity to occur at a faster rate than it normally would in this community alone. The transfer of knowledge relies on oral transmission. Although there was a language shift in El Molo to Samburu, in many of these cases where people leave shift to speaking a dominant language, they leave behind vast domains of knowledge that was previously acquired about the land, plants, animals, and so on. The ICH was implemented to provide for the protection and conservation of the cultures along with their history and traditions. As the language is dying out, so is the awareness and consciousness of the land that has accumulated over the years.

Background
The El Molo today primarily inhabit the northern Eastern Province of Kenya. They are concentrated in Marsabit District on the southeast shore of Lake Turkana, between El Molo bay and Mount Kulal. El Molo is critically endangered. There are a few native speakers worldwide. The language is extremely close to extinction since it was shifted as a secondary language by its originators in Kenya. It was thought to be extinct in the 20th century, but few speakers were later found. Since then, the language Samburu has been taking over El Molo and becoming the primary language. Based on evidence from the World Oral Literature Project there is projected to be 8 native speakers remaining. As mentioning in the subsection of how Intangible Cultural Heritage is, most of the indigenous knowledge is lost with there being only few native speakers remaining. Knowledge of the land is being lost in transmission. The ElMolo group are characterized by a low haplotype diversity (0.88), close to that observed in Khoisan hunter-gatherers, and by the non-significance of neutrality tests and the multimodal mismatch distribution indicating small population size and strong genetic drift. According to an mtDNA study by Castri, the maternal ancestry of the contemporary El Molo consists of a mixture of Afro-Asiatic-associated lineages and Sub-Saharan haplogroups, reflecting substantial female gene flow from neighboring Sub-Saharan populations. A little over 30% of the El Molo belonged to the West Eurasian haplogroups.

Language shift
Samburu is one of the three primary languages in Kenya with El Molo being included. El Molo shifted from an East Cushitic language ,we call ElMolo, to Samburu during the first half of the 20th century. The old Cushitic language of the El Molo was close to two languages, spoken mainly across the border in southwest Ethiopia: Dhaasanac(Tosco 2001) and particularly Arbore (Hayward 1984). According to linguistics experts, the name El Molo is a Samburu name referring to people who do not use livestock as their source of income. According to the community, the last “good” speaker, Kaayo, died in 1999. An unsolved question is whether the Elmolo were “originally” speakers of a Cushitic language, and still another is whether they were always fishers or rather pastoralists who turned to fishing out of necessity in an area utterly unsuitable to animal husbandry. Heine (1982) favors the first hypothesis, and claims that traditional fishing in Kenya’s Rift Valley is likely to go back to Eastern Cushites originating from the Ethiopian Highlands.

Present day
El Molo compromises of 2 small villages on opposite sides of the Lake Turkana. There are 400 households that hold 1900 people. There are only 2 El Molo villages in Kenya and most likely in the entire world. Although it is not just the youth who cannot speak the mother tongue, El Molo, many elders are not able to construct a sentence in El Molo. The remaining few speakers of the language are fighting to keep the language alive. The language and most of the culture has been lost to assimilation from surrounding neighbors. The dialect is on the verge of being extinct. Although, there is still a considerable quantity of preserved vocabulary for the language itself. The original Cushitic-Elmolo can be divided into items of basic vocabulary (such as body parts, numerals, names of plants and animals, and kinship terms). Samburu dialect is now spoken in substitute of El Molo, since it is more difficult to extend the use of the only basic vocabulary known. All the Cushitic material lost its original phonology and morphosyntax which has been adapted to Samburu. Meaning, present-day El Molo follows accords to the morphophonemic Samburu “language rules”.

Samburu
Samburu is a Maasai language (dialect) of Kenya that can go by alternative names of Burkeneji, E Lokop, Lokop, Nkutuk, Sambur, Sampur. One of the three locations is in Isiolo, Marsabit, and Samburu countries, especially East towards Marasabit which will lead one to Lake Turkana. The distance with between the Samburu and El Molo is why El Molo shifted languages and dialect. Lake Turkana is an area shared between the two communities. Samburu language is used at homes, social gatherings, and for religion. The language can be used for all ages. The population according to the 2009 census is 237,000 and yearly increasing.

Attempt at revitalization
In 1995 the “Elmolo Development Group” (EDG) was established to promote self-reliance among the Elmolo people especially in an attempt for revitalization. In this there also was an Elmolo language revival program that had begun. Founder and chairman, Michael Basili, of the Gura Pau was a teacher and later a schoolmaster and Education Officer of the Loiyangalani Division. He retired in 2006 and this is when he began to attempt to reinstate El Molo as the language of the community through school teaching. Basil and his collogues collected any further linguistic and anthropological data. Efforts were dropped in 2012 because it was difficult to implement and extend Cushitic lexical material as it was limited, or its knowledge was too unevenly spread among the community to be any help. Another thing discovered was how the El Molo people will not disclose themselves the population of their community. They believe that disclosing their numbers endangers them more since over the years they have been assimilated by their surrounding communities.

Impacts of language loss
With the language endangerment of El molo, there is a possibility of a loss of undiscovered and unique knowledge that is still yet to be explored.  Language is also a critical fundamental aspect of communication. It is through language that people can communicate with others of different cultures and gain insight and new knowledge. Dixon states, A language is the emblem of its speakers. Each language determines a unique way of viewing the world. Languages expose people to different ideas and different ways of thinking. Someone speaking a different language can describe the same object in a different way and it is this which provides us with a diversity that allows us to view things in other light. Furthermore, naming plants and animals is a universal human activity, but each culture develops its own habits. One thing as minor as name choice can reveal how a culture imagines the proper place for these creatures in the wild. The names a language bestows upon animals go beyond mere labels, but rather include a great deal of information about the proper place this community, such as El Molo, view this animal in the world.

References

Bibliography 
Brenzinger, Matthias (ed). 1992. Language Death: Factual and Theoretical Explorations and Special Reference to East Africa. Berlin: Mouton de Gruyter.
Brenzinger, Matthias. 1992. Lexical retention in language shift: Yaaku/ Mukogodo- Maasai and El-molo/Elmolo- Samburu. In Brenzinger (ed), 213–254. 
Bunyi, Grace. "Language in Education in Kenyan School". Encyclopedia of Language Education. Volume 5: 33.
Dyson, W. S. and Fuchs, V. E. 1937. The Elmolo. Journal of the Royal Anthropological Institute of Great Britain and Ireland 67. 327–338.
Fear of Extinction as the El Molo Numbers Drop (2010). allAfrica.com. 
Fishman, Joshua. Advances in language planning. Current Trend in Linguistics 7
Heine, Bernd. 1980. Elmolo. In Heine, Bernd (ed.), The Non-Bantu Languages of Kenya, 173–218. Berlin: Dietrich Reimer. Retrieved from: Glottolog. 
Joshua Project. "El Molo in Kenya".  Retrieved 9 March 2018.
Okuma, O. S. (2016). Conservation of Natural and Cultural Heritage in Kenya.
Tosco, Mauro. 1998. "People who are not the language they speak": on language shift without language decay in East Africa. In Brenzinger, M. (ed.), Endangered languages in Africa, 119-142. Cologne: Rüdiger Köppe Verlag.
Tosco, Mauro.  2012. What Terminal Speakers Can Do to Their Language: the Case of Elmolo. In Federico Corriente and Gregorio del Olmo Lete and Ángeles Vicente and Juan-Pablo Vita (eds.), Dialectology of the Semitic Languages. 131–143. Sabadell (Barcelona): Editorial AUSA.

Further reading
Hayward, Dick. 1984. The Arbore Language: A first Investigation; including a vocabulary. Hamburg: Helmut Buske Verlag.
Heine, Bernd. 1972/73. Vokabulare ostafrikanischer Restsprachen, 1: Elmolo. Afrika und Übersee 56. 276–283.
Scherrer, Carol. 1974. Effects of western influence on Elmolo, 1973-74. (Discussion papers from the Inst. of African Studies (IAS), 61.) Nairobi: University of Nairobi.
Sobiana, N.W. 1980. The Historical Tradition of the People of the Eastern Lake Turkana Basin, ca. 1840-1925. Ph.D. dissertation. London: University of London.

External links
 El Molo at the Endangered Languages Project

Western Omo–Tana languages
Languages of Kenya
Endangered Afroasiatic languages
Endangered languages of Africa